The 2021 Maryland Terrapins football team represented the University of Maryland during the 2021 NCAA Division I FBS football season. The Terrapins played their home games at Maryland Stadium in College Park, Maryland, and competed in the Big Ten Conference in the East Division. The team was coached by third-year head coach Mike Locksley and finished in fifth place in the East Division. The Terrapins defeated Virginia Tech in the Pinstripe Bowl to achieve their first bowl game since 2016, their first winning season since 2014, and their first bowl game victory since 2010.

Offseason

The Terrapins finished the 2020 season 2–3 in Big Ten play to finish in fourth place in the East Division.

Spring game

Recruiting

|}

Incoming transfers

Awards and honors

Watch list

Roster

Schedule 
The 2021 schedule consisted of 7 home games, 1 neutral game, and 5 away games. Of these, the Terrapins amassed a home record of 4–3 (1–3 Big Ten), a neutral record of 1–0 (0–0 Big Ten), and an away record of 2–3 (2–3 Big Ten).

Game summaries

vs. West Virginia

vs. Howard

at Illinois

vs. Kent State

vs. No. 5 Iowa

at No. 7 Ohio State

at Minnesota

vs Indiana

vs No. 22 Penn State

at No. 8 Michigan State

vs No. 8 Michigan

at Rutgers

vs. Virginia Tech

References

Maryland
Maryland Terrapins football seasons
Pinstripe Bowl champion seasons
Maryland Terrapins football